Lubutu is a town in Lubutu Territory, Maniema Province in the Democratic Republic of the Congo. As of 2012, it had an estimated population of 8,205. The town is a hub for collecting minerals mined in the area, but impassable roads are a significant obstacle to moving goods. In 2019 there was a protest of Mai-Mai Simba who stole some gold ore.

References 

Populated places in Maniema